Lithomyrmex can refer to:
Lithomyrmex Clark, 1928, junior synonym of Stigmatomma
Lithomyrmex Carpenter, 1930, junior synonym of Eulithomyrmex